The Men's 67.5 kg powerlifting event at the 2004 Summer Paralympics was competed  on 24 September. It was won by Metwaly Mathna, representing .

Final round

24 Sept. 2004, 13:45

References

M